The sparrow-weavers (Plocepasser) are a genus of birds in the family Ploceidae (weavers), but some taxonomic authorities place them in the family Passeridae (Old World sparrows).

Taxonomy and systematics 
The genus Plocepasser contains the following species:

Phylogeny 
Based on recent DNA-analysis (which only included P. mahali), the genus Plocepasser belongs to the group of sparrow weavers (subfamily Plocepasserinae), and is most related to the clade that consists of Philetairus socius and the genus Pseudonigrita. This clade is sister to the most basic genus of the subfamily, Sporopipes. Provided that genera are correct clades, the following tree expresses current insights.

References

External links

Ploceidae
Taxonomy articles created by Polbot